More Funk is a live album by American jazz pianist Don Pullen and saxophonist George Adams recorded in 1979 for the Italian Palcoscenico label.

Track listing
 "Metamorphosis for Charles Mingus" (George Adams, Don Pullen, Dannie Richmond) - 15:12 
 "So Nice" (Adams, Pullen) - 10:40 
 "God Bless the Child" (Arthur Herzog, Jr. Billie Holiday) - 15:30 
 "Devil Blues" (Charles Mingus, George Adams, Clarence "Gatemouth" Brown) - 10:15 
Recorded at Ciak in Milano, Italy on November 3, 1979

Personnel
Don Pullen - piano
George Adams - tenor saxophone
Cameron Brown - bass
Dannie Richmond - drums

References

Palcoscenico Records live albums
Don Pullen live albums
George Adams (musician) live albums
1980 live albums